Gonegandla is a village in Gonegandla mandal in Kurnool district of Andhra Pradesh, India.

Geography
It has an average elevation of 370 meters (1217 feet).

References

Villages in Kurnool district